The Honours (Matrícula de Honor, in Spanish), in Spain, is a recognition granted  that rewards the academic result and trajectory of the students who obtain the maximum qualification in a certain subject. In the university, it leads to a discount in the enrollment rates of the following course corresponding to the number of ECTS credits in which this mention has been obtained.

In Spanish academic qualification system, there are two types of Honours: in Baccalaureate and in the university.

Honours in Baccalaureate 
In Baccalaureate, the best Baccalaureate academic record of the entire promotion is awarded with Honours, recognizing the excellent academic performance of the awarded student and entailing a discount on the university fees of the following year. Spanish legislation establishes that each Baccalaureate school can grant an Honours for every twenty students, if a school, in a promotion, has 100-110 students, there would be 5 Honours to be distributed among those students with the best Baccalaureate academic record of that promotion.

Obtaining mentions of Honours or other high qualifications may mean, at the end of the studies, obtaining the "Baccalaureate Extraordinary Award", access to the "Scholarships for Academic Excellence" of the Government and the "National Excellence Award" of the Ministry of Education (upon request of the person concerned).

Students who enter the university from Baccalaureate studies will have free tuition fees for the first year if they have obtained a global Honours classification in 2nd year of Baccalaureate or if they have obtained the "Baccalaureate Extraordinary Award". Likewise, they will be entitled to exemption from registration fees in the entrance exam (Selectivity). This free tuition is not incompatible with obtaining other grants contemplated in the call for grants from the Ministry of Education.

Honours in university 

The Honours in the university is granted in each subject enrolled in the university degree, to the student who obtains a classification equal to or greater than 9 and also deserves that qualification, recognizing the academic result and trajectory of the awarded student and this entails a discount on the rates of the university of the following year equal to the number of credits in which said Honours has been obtained. The legislation establishes that each university faculty can grant an Honours for every twenty students. It is similar to distinction (merit with distinction) in the English classification, but it is a little bit more than a distinction.

In the university, the honours are regulated by each Autonomous Community and each university. Students with the best record of each promotion will be recognized with the Award for Excellence in Academic Career. The centers (Faculties / Polytechnic School) propose to the University Council the granting of extraordinary prizes for each university degree offered by that university. The granting of extraordinary awards is made ex officio, the request by the interested party is not necessary. The obtaining of the extraordinary prize is notified in writing to the student, it means a mention in the student's file and title and entitles the refund of the fees paid for the issuance of the title.

Example of an academic record in the university with the rating system of Spanish universities (academic record of a bachelor's degree in law):

As you can see in the example, a grade of 10 out of 10 in a subject can be Merit, it doesn't have to be an honours classification. It is similar to distinction (Merit with distinction) in the English classification, but it is a little bit more than a distinction. In Spanish university qualification scale, there is: aprobado, bien / Pass (5 to 6.9), Notable / Good (7 to 8.9), Sobresaliente / Merit (9 to 10).

Notable students with Honours 

Among the people who have obtained Honours in Bachelor and / or University are:

 Soraya Saénz de Santamaría, she finished first of his promotion in the Law Degree at the University of Valladolid, with an academic record full of Honours and she obtained the Award for Excellence in Academic Career.
 Pablo Iglesias, he obtained 13 Honours in his university degree in the Complutense University of Madrid (in Political Science), the best record of his promotion and therefore obtained the Award for Excellence in Academic Career.
 Mario Conde, he obtained Honours in all subjects of the Law Degree at the University of Deusto, and the highest grade ever achieved in oppositions to State Lawyer.
 Jesús Posada, civil engineer, has 40 honors in his academic record, in addition to obtaining the "Baccalaureate Extraordinary Award".

See also 

 Award for Excellence in Academic Career (university)
 Valedictorian
 Class rank
 Dux
 Grade inflation
 Latin honors

References 

Academic terminology
Academic honours
Qualifications
Education awards
Education in Spain